The 2022 All England Open (officially known as the Yonex All England Open Badminton Championships 2022 for sponsorship reasons) was a badminton tournament that took place at Utilita Arena Birmingham in Birmingham, England, from 16 to 20 March 2022 and had a total prize pool of $990,000.

Tournament
The 2022 All England Open was the fifth tournament of the 2022 BWF World Tour and was part of the All England Open Badminton Championships, which had been held since 1899. The tournament was organized by the Badminton England with sanction from the Badminton World Federation.

Venue
This tournament took place at Utilita Arena Birmingham in Birmingham, England.

Point distribution
Below is the point distribution table for each phase of the tournament based on the BWF points system for the BWF World Tour Super 1000 event.

Prize pool
The total prize money was US$1,000,000 with the distribution of the prize money in accordance with BWF regulations.

Men's singles

Seeds 

 Viktor Axelsen (champion)
 Kento Momota (quarter-finals)
 Anders Antonsen (second round)
 Chou Tien-chen (semi-finals)
 Anthony Sinisuka Ginting (quarter-finals)
 Lee Zii Jia (semi-finals)
 Jonatan Christie (quarter-finals)
 Ng Ka Long (second round)

Finals

Top half

Section 1

Section 2

Bottom half

Section 3

Section 4

Women's singles

Seeds 

 Tai Tzu-ying (semi-finals)
 Akane Yamaguchi (champion)
 Chen Yufei (semi-finals)
 An Se-young (final)
 Nozomi Okuhara (quarter-finals)
 P. V. Sindhu (second round)
 Ratchanok Intanon (withdrew)
 He Bingjiao (quarter-finals)

Finals

Top half

Section 1

Section 2

Bottom half

Section 3

Section 4

Men's doubles

Seeds 

 Marcus Fernaldi Gideon / Kevin Sanjaya Sukamuljo (semi-finals)
 Mohammad Ahsan / Hendra Setiawan (final)
 Takuro Hoki / Yugo Kobayashi (quarter-finals)
 Aaron Chia / Soh Wooi Yik (second round)
 Satwiksairaj Rankireddy / Chirag Shetty (quarter-finals)
 Fajar Alfian / Muhammad Rian Ardianto (first round)
 Kim Astrup / Anders Skaarup Rasmussen (quarter-finals)
 Ong Yew Sin / Teo Ee Yi (second round)

Finals

Top half

Section 1

Section 2

Bottom half

Section 3

Section 4

Women's doubles

Seeds 

 Chen Qingchen / Jia Yifan (first round)
 Lee So-hee / Shin Seung-chan (quarter-finals)
 Kim So-yeong / Kong Hee-yong (quarter-finals)
 Yuki Fukushima / Sayaka Hirota (first round)
 Mayu Matsumoto / Wakana Nagahara (withdrew)
 Greysia Polii / Apriyani Rahayu (second round)
 Nami Matsuyama / Chiharu Shida (champions)
 Jongkolphan Kititharakul / Rawinda Prajongjai (quarter-finals)

Finals

Top half

Section 1

Section 2

Bottom half

Section 3

Section 4

Mixed doubles

Seeds 

 Dechapol Puavaranukroh / Sapsiree Taerattanachai (semi-finals)
 Zheng Siwei / Huang Yaqiong (semi-finals)
 Wang Yilyu / Huang Dongping (final)
 Yuta Watanabe / Arisa Higashino (champions)
 Praveen Jordan / Melati Daeva Oktavianti (quarter-finals)
 Marcus Ellis / Lauren Smith (second round)
 Tan Kian Meng / Lai Pei Jing (quarter-finals)
 Thom Gicquel / Delphine Delrue (quarter-finals)

Finals

Top half

Section 1

Section 2

Bottom half

Section 3

Section 4

References

External links
 Tournament Link

All England Open Badminton Championships
All England Open
All England Open
All England Open